The Monster That Challenged the World (original working titles: The Jagged Edge and The Kraken) is a 1957 black-and-white science-fiction monster film from Gramercy Pictures, produced by Arthur Gardner, Jules V. Levy, and Arnold Laven (who also directed), and starring Tim Holt and Audrey Dalton. The film was distributed by United Artists as a double feature with The Vampire.

The film concerns an army of giant mollusks that emerge from California's Salton Sea.

The Monster That Challenged the Worlds Gramercy Pictures is not related to the former PolyGram division of the same name.

Plot
In the Salton Sea, an underwater earthquake causes a crevice to open, releasing prehistoric giant mollusks. A rescue training parachute jump is conducted, but the patrol boat sent to pick up the jumper finds only a floating parachute. One sailor dives in but also disappears. The other sailor screams in terror as something rises from the water.

When the patrol boat does not answer radio calls, Lt. Cmdr. John "Twill" Twillinger takes a rescue party out on a second patrol boat to investigate. They find the deserted patrol boat covered in a strange slime; the jumper's body then floats to the surface, now blackened and drained of bodily fluids. Twill takes a sample of the slime to the base lab for analysis, where he teams up with recently widowed Gail MacKenzie and Dr. Jess Rogers.

A young couple disappear after going for a swim. U.S. Navy divers investigate and discover a giant egg and the body of one of the victims on the ocean floor. The divers are attacked by a giant mollusk (which looks like a giant caterpillar), which kills one of the divers. The mollusk attacks the boat, but Twill stabs it in the eye with a grappling hook. The egg is taken to the U.S. Navy lab for study and kept under temperature control to prevent it from hatching.

The mollusks escape into an irrigation canal system, attacking livestock, a lock keeper, a trysting couple, and others. Navy divers locate a group of mollusks in the canal system, and use explosives to destroy them.

In the meantime, Gail is at the lab with her young daughter, Sandy. Worried about the lab rabbits being cold in the lab's lowered temperature, Sandy surreptitiously turns up the thermostat. Twill calls the lab and gets no answer. He arrives and finds that the hatched mollusk has Gail and Sandy cornered in a closet, where they ran to escape from the monster. He fights it with lab chemicals, a CO2 fire extinguisher and a live steam line until other Navy personnel arrive and shoot the mollusk.

Cast

Production
 
The story for The Monster That Challenged the World came from David Duncan, who also went on to pen screenplays for The Time Machine (1960) and Fantastic Voyage (1966). During production, Duncan's original work was titled The Jagged Edge, before the screenplay was renamed The Kraken.  Prior to the film's release, it was once more retitled, this time to The Monster That Challenged the World.

Filming took place in 16 days on a budget of $200,000. A majority of the underwater scenes in the production were shot at Catalina Island off the coast of Los Angeles. Other primary filming locations included the Salton Sea, as well as Brawley and Barstow, California. The close-ups were later filmed in a tank filled with water and plastic seaweed.

In a 2016 interview, star Audrey Dalton recalled: "I thought it was a very interesting experience - as all my movies were in different ways. The director, Arnold Laven, had formed a production company with Jules Levy and Arthur Gardner. The monster stuff was fun, crouching behind a desk with a monster breaking down the wall. But you had to play it very straight. Once you start seeing the funny side of it, it doesn't work. Tim Holt had come out of retirement to do this movie. He was a quiet, very nice man - the most 'unactor' actor that I ever worked with. The film's poster features a woman in a bathing suit. People think it's me, but it was the actress whose character was drowned in the opening sequence. She's pulled into the water by the monster. We shot down on the beach for that. I think the rest of it was filmed along the California Aqueduct." [The scene involving a woman in a bathing suit actually occurs halfway through the film.]

Reception
A TV Guide review of The Monster That Challenged the World noted,  "Fine special effects help this film along by adding an atmosphere of impending danger." A later review by author Dave Sindelar of Fantastic Film Musings and Ramblings remarked: "For some reason, this fifties monster movie doesn't get much respect, but I think it holds up extraordinarily well. For one thing, I think the characters are unusually well drawn for this type of movie, and they're given a dimension and a sense of realness that adds a lot to the proceedings".

Respect for the "monster" also dominated a later review of The Monster That Challenged the World in the Video Movie Guide: "This late-1950s sci-fi programmer is set apart by only one thing: the giant monster, which is life-size (not a miniature), and given plenty of screen time."

Home video
The film was released on DVD as part of MGM's Midnite Movies collection, both by itself and as a double feature with It! The Terror from Beyond Space. Kino Lorber's Blu-ray release of the film featured an audio commentary by Tom Weaver, Dr. Robert J. Kiss and David Schecter.

See also
 List of American films of 1957

References

Notes

Citations

Bibliography

 Martin, Mick and Marsha Porter. Video Movie Guide (2002 ed.). New York: Ballantine Publishing Group, 2001. .
 Warren, Bill. Keep Watching the Skies: American Science Fiction Films of the Fifties, 21st Century Edition. Jefferson, North Carolina: McFarland & Company, 2009, (First edition 1982). .
 Weaver, Tom. Return of the B Science Fiction and Horror Heroes: The Mutant Melding of Two Volumes of Classic Interviews. Jefferson, North Carolina: McFarland & Company, 1999. .

External links

 
 
 
 
  film trailer
 Monster That Challenged the World complete film at Dailymotion (public domain)
 Original soundtrack of Heinz Roemheld’s score from The Monster That Challenged the World

1957 films
1957 horror films
American black-and-white films
American science fiction horror films
Films directed by Arnold Laven
Films set in California
Films shot in California
Giant monster films
United Artists films
Films scored by Heinz Roemheld
1950s monster movies
American monster movies
Molluscs in popular culture
Films with screenplays by David Duncan (writer)
American exploitation films
American natural horror films
1950s English-language films
1950s American films